Buttercups are several species of the genus Ranunculus.

Buttercup may also refer to:

Characters
 Buttercup (Toy Story), a character in Toy Story 3
 Princess Buttercup, a character in the novel The Princess Bride and film based on it
 Buttercup Utonium, a character in The Powerpuff Girls
 Buttercup (Kaoru Matsubara), a character in Powerpuff Girls Z
 Little Buttercup (Mrs. Cripps), a character in the musical H.M.S. Pinafore

Places
 Buttercup, Belize, a village in the Belize District
 Buttercup Mountain, a mountain in Idaho

Vehicles
 Wittman Buttercup, a homebuilt aircraft
 HMS Buttercup (K193), a Flower-class corvette launched in 1941

Art, entertainment, and media 
"Buttercup", a song by YouTuber and musician Jack Stauber
 Buttercup (TV series), a Filipino television series
 Buttercup (fairy tale), a Norwegian fairy tale

Other plants 
 Buttercups, the common name for Verticordia aurea
 Buttercup tree, the common name for Cochlospermum religiosum
 Bermuda buttercup, the common name for Oxalis pes-caprae

People with the given name
 Buttercup Dickerson (1858–1920), 19th-century Major League Baseball outfielder

See also 
 Buttercup Festival, a webcomic by David Troupes
 Buttercup squash, a variety of the winter squash species Cucurbita maxima
 HMS Buttercup, a list of vessels built for the Royal Navy
 Little Buttercup or Santa Fe No. 5, an 0-4-0 steam locomotive 
 Sicilian Buttercup chicken, a breed of chicken